23135 Pheidas, provisional designation: , is a large Jupiter trojan from the Greek camp, approximately  in diameter. It was discovered on 7 January 2000, by astronomers with the Lincoln Near-Earth Asteroid Research at the Lincoln Laboratory's Experimental Test Site near Socorro, New Mexico, in the United States. The dark Jovian asteroid belongs to the 50 largest Jupiter trojans and has a rotation period of 8.7 hours. It was named after the Athenian warrior Pheidas from Greek mythology.

Orbit and classification 

As all Jupiter trojans, Pheidas is in a 1:1 resonance with Jupiter. It is located in the leading Greek camp at Jupiter's  Lagrangian point, 60° ahead of the Gas Giant's orbit (see Trojans in astronomy). It is a non-family asteroid in the Jovian background population.

This asteroid orbits the Sun at a distance of 5.0–5.5 AU once every 12 years and 1 month (4,400 days; semi-major axis of 5.26 AU). Its orbit has an eccentricity of 0.05 and an inclination of 17° with respect to the ecliptic.

Numbering and naming 

This minor planet was numbered by the Minor Planet Center on 9 March 2001. On 14 May 2021, the object was named by the Working Group Small Body Nomenclature (WGSBN), after the Athenian warrior Pheidas from Greek mythology. In the Trojan War, Pheidas followed his leader Menestheus and fought to prevent Hector from reaching the Greek ships.

Physical characteristics 

Pheidas is an assumed C-type asteroid, a typical spectral type besides the D- and P-types among the population of Jovian asteroids.

Rotation period 

In November 2011, a rotational lightcurve of Pheidas was obtained from photometric observations by Robert Stephens at the Goat Mountain Astronomical Research Station  in collaboration with Linda French at Illinois Wesleyan University and Daniel Coley at the Trojan Station of Center for Solar System Studies , as well as Ralph Megna and Lawrence Wasserman. Lightcurve analysis gave a rotation period of 8.69 hours with a brightness amplitude of 0.27 magnitude. The result supersedes a previous observation from a fragmentary lightcurve that gave a period of only 6.86 hours.

Diameter and albedo 

According to the surveys carried out by the Japanese Akari satellite and the NEOWISE mission of NASA's Wide-field Infrared Survey Explorer, Pheidas measures 66.23 and 68.50 kilometers in diameter and its surface has an albedo of 0.044 and 0.042, respectively.

The Collaborative Asteroid Lightcurve Link assumes a standard albedo for a carbonaceous asteroid of 0.057 and consequently calculates a shorter diameter (due to the higher albedo) of 58.29 kilometers using an absolute magnitude of 9.9.

References

External links 
 Asteroid Lightcurve Database (LCDB), query form (info )
 Discovery Circumstances: Numbered Minor Planets (20001)-(25000) – Minor Planet Center
 
 

023135
023135
023135
Named minor planets
19981110